The Salem Police Department (SPD) is the police department in the city of Salem, Massachusetts. The police headquarters was built in 1991 and is located at 95 Margin Street. , the Chief of the Department is Lucas Miller.

Rank structure

History
The Salem Police Department has a long history, tracing its roots back to the constables and sheriffs of the 1600s. The department was organized into its current form on May 23, 1836, by city ordinance, making it one of the oldest police departments in the country.

The department's former headquarters was located at 17 Central Street and was in use from 1914 to 1992. A new headquarters building was opened in 1992, and dedicated in the name of former Chief Robert St. Pierre on May 11, 2012.

Three officers in the Salem Police Department have died while on duty.

Personnel

Sworn personnel 
The following is a breakdown of the sworn personnel by city ordinance when fully staffed.

Emergency dispatch 
Salem PD is the primary public-safety answering point (PSAP) for the City of Salem and is the initial call point responsible for all emergency 911 calls, including medical and fire. In 2013 Salem PD responded to approximately 40,000 calls for service. Approximately 1/8 of all calls are forwarded to the Fire Department, but those calls are also served by SPD. The dispatch center also receives calls for the Salem State University and the SPD works closely with them on matters of mutual concern. The dispatch center is typically staffed by one or two civilian dispatchers, one House Officer/Dispatcher, 1 House Sergeant and 1 lieutenant (Officer in Charge).

Dive team
The SPD maintains a highly trained dive team of full-time sworn police officers. The team is made up of eighteen police officers, including the Salem Harbormaster. Each of the divers and Harbormaster are sworn full-time police officers who hold multiple dive certifications ranging in areas to include Rapid Deployment, Rescue Diving, Search and Recovery, Black-water Diving, Ice Diving, and Underwater Criminal Investigation. The team is led by a Captain who is designated as the "Officer-in-Charge". The dive team is the sole official dive team resource of NEMLEC, which provides regional mutual aid to over 43 communities and 58 agencies in northeastern Massachusetts.

Criminal Investigation Division
The Criminal Investigation Division, also known as CID, is headed by a lieutenant, as the Unit Commander, and two sergeants as shift supervisors. There is one lieutenant, two sergeants, 8 detectives, 1 Domestic Violence Liaison Officer, 1 Animal Control Officer and 1 Latent Print Technician (Retired Detective).

See also

 List of law enforcement agencies in Massachusetts

References

Municipal police departments of Massachusetts
Salem, Massachusetts